Mark Sergeev (1926–1997) (Russian: Марк Сергеев) was a Russian poet. As a writer, Sergeev is known by his books Rail Tracks, A Ballad About Poplars, Carving, Connection of Times, and Evening Birds. He has published about 20 poetic collections.

Sergeev's first book was a collection of cheerful poems for children. About 60 children's books of his were published.

Biography 
Born in the family of a builder, later the head of a comprehensive survey party to check the Padunsky narrowing on the Angara River, David Markovich Gantvarger and Rosalia Gantvarger. On the maternal side, he was the great-grandson of the classic of Jewish literature, Mendele Mocher Sforim.

Took part in the Great Patriotic War, major. Just before graduation in June 1941, Sergeyev's entire class planted a poplar alley in front of the school. All the graduates vowed to return, but only five kept their vows - the rest died in the war. The poem "The Ballad of Poplars" is dedicated to this.

Graduated from the Faculty of History and Philology of the Irkutsk University.

In 1979, he joined the editorial board of the book series "Literary Monuments of Siberia" and "Polar Star" of the East Siberian Book Publishing House (Irkutsk).

In 1994, he initiated the creation of the All-Russian Festival "Days of Russian Spirituality and Culture" Radiance of Russia(Irkutsk).

He was buried in Irkutsk at the Radishchevsky cemetery.

Awards and prizes 

 Order of the Patriotic War II degree (1985).
 Order of the Badge of Honor.
 Order of Friendship of Peoples.
 Laureate of the Irkutsk Komsomol Prize.(1971)
 Laureate of the Prize of the Culture and Art Development Fund under the Committee of Culture of the Irkutsk Region (1996)

Memory 

 The Irkutsk Regional Children's Library bears the name of Mark Sergeev.
 The Irkutsk House of Writers bears name of Mark Sergeev.

1926 births
1997 deaths
People from Yenakiieve
Russian male poets
Soviet military personnel of World War II
Irkutsk State University alumni
20th-century Russian poets
20th-century Russian male writers
Soviet magazine editors
 On the house where Mark Sergeev lived, a memorial plaque was erected in memory of him.In Irkutsk, the "Intellectual of the Province" award named after Mark Sergeev was established.

References